The 2017 FIBA AmeriCup was the 18th edition of the FIBA AmeriCup, which is the main tournament for senior men's basketball national teams of the FIBA Americas. The tournament was held in Medellín, Colombia, Montevideo, Uruguay, and Bahía Blanca and Córdoba, in Argentina, from 25 August, to 3 September 2017.

Unlike previous editions, the tournament did not award spots for the FIBA World Cup or the Summer Olympic Games. However, the top seven teams qualified to the 2019 Pan American Games.    

The United States, with a team of NBA G League players, won their seventh gold medal at the tournament, after defeating Argentina, by a score of 81–76, in the final, while Mexico took home the bronze, by beating the U.S. Virgin Islands, 79–65.

Qualified teams 
The top five teams at the 2016 Centrobasket and 2016 South American Championship qualified to the tournament, plus Canada and United States as the only countries in their subregion.

 Host nations
 
 
 

 Central American and Caribbean Subzone: 
 
 
 
 
 

 North American Subzone:
 
 

 South American Subzone:

Hosts selection
On 5 April 2017 FIBA Americas announced that Argentina, Colombia and Uruguay were chosen as the hosts of the AmeriCup.

Venues

Squads

Draw
The draw was held in Buenos Aires, Argentina on 20 April 2017.

 Suspended at the time of the draw.

First round

Group A

All times are local (UTC−5).

Group B

* Two qualifying spots were available from Group B as Argentina were guaranteed to progress, regardless of their performance, due to their status as the "main organiser" of the tournament.

All times are local (UTC−3).

Group C

All times are local (UTC−3).

Final round

All times are local (UTC−3).

Semifinals

Third place game

Final

Final standings

Statistics and awards

Statistical leaders

Points

Rebounds

Assists

Blocks

Steals

Awards

All-Tournament Team
 Facundo Campazzo
 Francisco Cruz
 Darrun Hilliard 
 Nicolás Brussino 
 Jameel Warney (MVP)

References

External links

FIBA AmeriCup
2017–18 in South American basketball
2017–18 in North American basketball
2017–18 in Argentine basketball
2017 in Colombian sport
2017 in Uruguayan sport
International basketball competitions hosted by Argentina
International basketball competitions hosted by Colombia
International basketball competitions hosted by Uruguay
Sport in Medellín
Bahía Blanca
Sport in Córdoba, Argentina
Sports competitions in Montevideo
August 2017 sports events in South America
September 2017 sports events in South America
Qualification tournaments for the 2019 Pan American Games